"Emotion in Motion" is a song by Ric Ocasek, the main songwriter and lead vocalist for The Cars. It was featured on his second solo album, This Side of Paradise, and released as a single in late 1986. The tune topped the Album Rock Tracks chart and reached number 15 on the Billboard Hot 100. The song features Tears For Fears' frontman Roland Orzabal as a guest musician. It was Ocasek's only top 40 hit as a solo artist.

Background 
Ocasek was a founding member, lead singer and principal songwriter of the new wave rock band The Cars. Following the group's 1985 Greatest Hits release, its members split up to pursue solo projects. Lead guitarist Elliot Easton released a solo album in 1985, and both Ocasek and singer/bassist Benjamin Orr did the same in 1986.
Just as "Emotion in Motion" was Ocasek's only solo song to reach the Top 40, Orr's "Stay the Night" was the latter's only solo Top 40 hit.

The band reunited to record 1987's Door to Door, which produced "You Are the Girl", the group's last Top 40 single.

Charts

Weekly charts

Year-end charts

References 

1986 singles
Geffen Records singles
Song recordings produced by Ric Ocasek
Song recordings produced by Ross Cullum
Song recordings produced by Chris Hughes (record producer)
Songs written by Ric Ocasek